Mahabe is a town and commune in western Madagascar. It belongs to the district of Besalampy, which is a part of Melaky Region. The population of the commune was estimated to be approximately 10,000 in 2001 commune census.

Only primary schooling is available. The majority 85% of the population of the commune are farmers, while an additional 15% receives their livelihood from raising livestock. The most important crops are rice and raffia palm, while other important agricultural products are peanuts and cassava.

References and notes 

Populated places in Melaky